HTC Desire 22 Pro is an Android-based smartphone manufactured by HTC. The phone was announced in June 2022.

Design 
The display of the phone is protected by Corning Gorilla Glass. The back panel is made from ceramic. It has IP67 rating for water and dust protection. The colour options are  Wave Gold and Starry Night Black.

Hardware 
It use the Snapdragon 695 chipset and offer UFS 3.1 with expandable storage. It comes in a single 8GB+128GB configuration. The phone has 6.6-inch Full-HD+ (1080 x 2412 pixels) display with a 120 Hz refresh rate and a 20:9 aspect ratio. The phone has a 4250 mAh battery with 18W charging. It has an option for wireless charging. Its camera comes out with a 64MP primary sensor paired with 13MP and 5MP secondary cameras for ultrawide and depth-sensing. The front camera offers a 32MP selfie shooter.

References 

Android (operating system) devices
Desire 22 Pro
Phablets
Mobile phones introduced in 2022